is the eleventh studio album by Japanese girl group Morning Musume. The album was released on December 1, 2010, in a normal and limited edition, the first press of the normal edition coming with a photocard, and the limited edition coming with a bonus DVD (containing solo shots of each member for the "Onna to Otoko no Lullaby Game" PV, and the graduation announcement) and a different cover. The album, their second album release in less than a year, was the last to feature sixth-generation member Eri Kamei and eighth-generation members Junjun and Linlin prior to their December 15 graduation.

Writing and development
The album's concept, as stated by writer and producer Tsunku, is "a mixture of fantasy and reality". The album's songs represent various genres, from rock and pop to Motown. The opening song, "Onna to Otoko no Lullaby Game", is described as the "prologue" to the album.

The album features two solos: "Ai no Honō", performed by Reina Tanaka, and "Denwa de ne", performed by Ai Takahashi. While these are the only solos, other members are allocated main vocals on some songs: Sayumi Michishige on "Fantasy ga Hajimaru", Risa Niigaki on "Onna Gokoro to Nan to Yara", and Eri Kamei on "Itoshiku Kurushii Kono Yoru ni". Similarly to the group's previous album, 10 My Me, the eighth generation, Aika Mitsui, Junjun and Linlin are heavily featured on the same track: track 7, "Sungoi My Birthday".

Ai Takahashi and Eri Kamei provide almost all of the chorus vocals on the album; Kamei is featured in the chorus of all but two songs, Tanaka and Takahashi's solos, and Takahashi is featured on all songs except tracks 5 and 9. Producer Tsunku also appears in the chorus for track 2, "Bravo!".

Singles
The album only features two singles,  a rarity for the group. It also does not include "Appare Kaiten Zushi!", a promotional song released under the name "Muten Musume".

The first single from the album, "Onna to Otoko no Lullaby Game", was released on November 27, 2010 as the group's 44th single. Although it was a graduation single it charted relatively poorly, peaking at #6 on the Oricon singles chart, despite a reported total of 42,405 copies in its first week.

The second and final single to be featured on the album, "Seishun Collection", was released on June 6, 2010. The single, their 43rd, reached a weekly peak of #3 on the Oricon singles charts, making it one of the group's more successful singles of recent years.

Track listing

Chart performance
The album peaked at #16 on the weekly Oricon music charts and charted for three weeks, selling 10,554 copies in its first week.

Personnel

Kazuyoshi Araki - A&R coordination
Yutaka Asahina - produced assistant (TNX)
Shirohide Azuma - art direction & design (W.PG)
Chino  - chorus (5)
Dolls House Japan - special thanks
Misako Fukuda - sales promotion
Shin Hashimoto - label manager
Akane Ichishima - hair & make-up
Miyuki Ito - promotion
Junjun - vocal, chorus (6, 7)
Koji Kamada - director (TNX)
Eri Kamei - vocal, chorus (1, 2, 3, 4, 6, 7, 8, 9, 11)
Kantaro Kawada - management
Kazuhiko Kawata - sales promotion
Ayuchi Kenmochi - recording coordination desk (TNX)
Shintaro Kikuchi - special thanks (No Fake No Fade)
Saki Kimura - produced assistant (TNX)
Shinnosuke Kobayashi - recording coordination (TNX)
Yusuke Kozuka - photographer
Linlin - vocal, chorus (6, 7)
Yasuji Yasman Maeda - mastering engineer (Berine Grundman Mastering)
Kazumi Matsui - mixing engineer (3, 4, 6, 9), recording engineer
Keigo Mikami - special thanks (Popholic)
Aika Mitsui - vocal, chorus (7)
Shuhei Miyaichi - promotion
Masayuki Miyazaki - management
Natsuki Mukai - promotion desk
Yoji Mochida - artist producer
Tomoko Nakamura - promotion

Hitomi Nakano - producer's management desk (TNX)
Risa Niigaki - vocal, chorus (3, 4)
Yoshitake Ogawa - producer's chief management (TNX)
Yusuke Ogawa - assistant engineer
Toshiya Ohta - hair & make-up (Maroon Brand)
Naoya Ohtani - chief promotion
Satoshi Oka - special thanks (Supa Love)
Haruka Okayasu - chief promotion
Mitsuhiro Sagara - producer's management (TNX)
Hiroharu Saito - hair & make-up
Yukina Saito - management
Yukio Seto - label producer
Hiromi Sugusawa - sales promotion desk
Satoru Takase - stylist
Ai Takahashi - vocal, chorus (1, 2, 3, 4, 6, 7, 8, 10, 11)
Kyoko Takeuchi - art direction & design (W.PG)
Sho Takimoto - management
Sugie Tokiwa - chief producer
Tsunku - producer, chorus (2)
Shiina Ueki - A&R coordination desk
Nobuyasu Umemoto - producer's assistant (TNX)
Ryo Wakizaka - mixing engineer (1, 2, 5, 7, 8, 10, 11), recording engineer
Chihiro Watanabe - promotion
Eiko Watanabe - hair & make-up
Kazuya Yamazawa - producer's management (TNX)
Nsoki Yamazaki - executive producer
Takeshi Yanagisawa - recording engineer
Sayaka Yoshida - promotion desk

References

External links
Official comments by Tsunku
Fantasy! Jūichi at the official Hello! Project discography
Fantasy! Jūichi at the official Up-Front Works discography
Normal and Limited edition Oricon profiles

2010 albums
Morning Musume albums
Zetima albums